Laal or LAAL may be,

 Laal language
 Laal (band)
 Laal (film)
 Living Archive of Aboriginal Languages

See also
 Lal (disambiguation)